The Korg VC-10 is an analogue vocoder which Korg launched in 1978. Vocoding refers to voice encoding of speech and singing with musical synthesis. It gained popularity in the 1970s following utilisation by bands such as Kraftwerk and Electric Light Orchestra. The VC-10 allows basic functionality in operation and modulation of signal carriers. It has two microphone input options.

Features
The VC-10 "achieved a measure of popularity because it was simple to use, relatively inexpensive and completely self-contained." It features 32 note polyphony (one oscillator per key, individually tuneable), 20 analysis bands, ensemble mode with speed and depth controls (a bi-phase chorus function), accent bend control (adds a slight pitch wavering effect so that the sound produced is more like a human voice), octave-up control (extends the range of the keyboard), and tune control as well as various settings relating to input and output mix.

The VC-10 allows for an input from an external signal carrier, such as an electric guitar, to be modulated by the keyboard. It also features an external pitch control input.

Microphone input options

The unit was originally supplied with a gooseneck microphone (the Korg MC-01) which plugged into a bespoke BTS connector. This type of connector is now obsolete. It appears to have originated around 1965 and was phased out when XLR became the standard in later years. It is difficult to source a microphone that will connect to it but TOA Japan  still (as of Jan 2015, at a cost of approx. £100) makes a compatible model, the DM-524B. The VC-10 also has a front panel standard microphone 1/4" input jack.

Front panel typo
It has been noted on Korg Kornucopia mailing lists that early versions of the VC-10 have a misprint on the front panel block diagram, which spells "FREQUENCY RESPONCE SIMULATOR" rather than the correct "FREQUENCY RESPONSE SIMULATOR".

Notable users in popular music

The Korg VC-10 has been featured in popular music, with notable users including:

External links
Official 1978 VC-10 demo recording
The VC-10 and MC-01 microphone owners manuals

References

V
Synthesizers